Dejon Brissett (born July 9, 1996) is a professional Canadian football wide receiver for the Toronto Argonauts of the Canadian Football League (CFL). He played college football for the Richmond Spiders and the Virginia Cavaliers.

Early life and high school career
Brissett is a native of Mississauga, Ontario, and primarily played basketball growing up before turning his attention to football. He transferred to Lake Forest Academy in Illinois for his sophomore year, where he played basketball, football, and track. His 46-3 triple jump was the best in 2015 by more than a foot. On the football field, he played wide receiver, defense, and special teams. Brissett ran a 4.59 40-yard dash, has a vertical leap of 35 inches, and was named the Chicago Catholic League Red Division's Offensive Player of the Year.

College career
Brissett began his collegiate career at Richmond. He made five catches for 66 yards as a sophomore in 2016. In the second game of his junior season, Brissett made 12 receptions for 159 yards in a 20–17 win at Colgate. As a junior in 2017, he made 63 receptions for 896 yards and seven touchdowns, averaging 81.5 receiving yards per game. Brissett was named to the First Team All-Colonial Athletic Association. In 2018, he made 16 receptions for 299 yards and a touchdown, averaging 99.7 yards per game. His season was cut short after three games after an ankle injury that he suffered on September 13 against Saint Francis (PA). During his Richmond career, Brissett recorded 86 receptions for 1,282 yards and nine touchdowns and returned 41 kicks for 941 yards and one touchdown. Brissett applied for a medical hardship waiver from the NCAA, and after receiving it decided to transfer to Virginia for his final season of eligibility, despite initially saying he was going to play at Illinois. He was sparingly used by the Cavaliers, playing in 12 of 14 games and contributing two receptions for 18 yards in the season.

Professional career
Brissett was drafted second overall in the 2020 CFL Draft by the Toronto Argonauts. He joins an Argonauts team that finished with a 4–14 record in 2019. Brissett is the fourth Cavalier drafted in the CFL Draft since 2012 and first since Trent Corney was taken in 2016 by the Winnipeg Blue Bombers. He did not play in 2020 due to the cancellation of the 2020 CFL season and officially signed with the Argonauts on May 5, 2021.

Personal life
Brissett is the son of McKeitha McFarlane and Bernard Brissett, who separated when he was young. He is of Jamaican descent. Brissett is the older brother of Oshae Brissett, who played college basketball at Syracuse before signing with the Toronto Raptors.

References

External links
 Toronto Argonauts bio
 Virginia Cavaliers bio
 Richmond Spiders bio

1996 births
Living people
Canadian football wide receivers
Canadian sportspeople of Jamaican descent
Black Canadian players of American football
American football wide receivers
Players of Canadian football from Ontario
Richmond Spiders football players
Virginia Cavaliers football players
Sportspeople from Mississauga
Toronto Argonauts players